Roger and the Fox is a 1947 American children's picture book by Lavinia R. Davis and illustrated by Hildegard Woodward. The book was a recipient of a 1948 Caldecott Honor for its illustrations.

Plot
All during the autumn, Roger tries in vain to find the fox, but his Christmas present finally provides the opportunity.

References

1947 children's books
American children's books
American picture books
Christmas children's books
Caldecott Honor-winning works
English-language books
Fictional children
Books about dogs
Books about foxes
Hunting in popular culture
United States in fiction
Forests in fiction
Autumn in culture
Male characters in literature
Child characters in literature
Doubleday (publisher) books